Kadiatou Touré (born January 18, 1983) is a Malian women's basketball player. Toure competed for Mali at the 2008 Summer Olympics, where she scored 17 points in 5 games. She was born in Markala, Ségou Region on the Niger River.

References

1983 births
Living people
Malian women's basketball players
Olympic basketball players of Mali
Basketball players at the 2008 Summer Olympics
People from Ségou Region
21st-century Malian people